"Me and You and a Dog Named Boo" is the 1971 debut single by Lobo.  Written by Lobo under his real name Kent LaVoie, it appears on the Introducing Lobo album.

Composition
Lobo recalls: "I was working on several songs, including a tune about traveling around the country with this girl, and I was trying to rhyme 'you and me.' Now 'me and you' would have been easier, but I was trying to do it with proper grammar. I couldn’t find anything to rhyme that fit what I wanted to say in the song. Finally, after I got back home to Florida, I decided to turn the phrase around to 'me and you.' I was thinking about it, sitting in a room that had a big sliding glass door overlooking the back yard. My big German Shepherd dog: Boo, came running around the corner and looked in at me. I said: 'Well, now, that’s kinda freaky. How about putting 'a dog named Boo’ into the song?” That’s literally how it came about. All of a sudden the song really started coming together. I hadn’t been to any of the places mentioned in the song except Georgia, but I just kept putting in places that sounded far away like Minneapolis and L.A."

Impact

The single peaked at #5 on the Hot 100 and was the first of four of his songs to hit #1 on the Easy Listening chart, where it had a two-week stay at that top spot in May 1971.  The song also reached #4 in the UK Singles Chart in July 1971 and spent four weeks at #1 in New Zealand.

Internationally, "Me and You and a Dog Named Boo" was Lobo's second most successful song among more than 15 single releases, surpassed only by "I'd Love You to Want Me" the following year.

Chart history

Weekly charts

Year-end charts

Cover versions
 Later in 1971, country artist Stonewall Jackson recorded the song, which was his final Top 40 hit on the US country chart, peaking at #7.
 Perry Como recorded the song for his 1971 album I Think of You.
 In 1972, a version was sung by The Brady Kids in the episode "Who Was That Dog...?" on their Saturday morning cartoon show.
 Agnes Chan recorded the song for her 1972 album Original I (A New Beginning).

See also
 List of number-one adult contemporary singles of 1971 (U.S.)
 List of number-one singles in 1971 (New Zealand)

References

1971 debut singles
Lobo (musician) songs
Songs written by Lobo (musician)
Stonewall Jackson (musician) songs
Number-one singles in New Zealand
1971 songs
Big Tree Records singles
Songs about dogs